Climax was an unincorporated mining village and a former U.S. Post Office located in Lake County, Colorado, United States. Climax is known for its large molybdenum ore deposit. It was the highest human settlement in the United States, and it holds the record for having had the country's second highest Post Office and the highest railroad station.

After mining ceased, the residential houses were all transported to the West Park subdivision of Leadville, Colorado, before 1965, leaving only the mining buildings standing.

After a 17-year shutdown, the Climax mine has reopened and resumed shipment of molybdenum on May 10, 2012.

History

Climax's reason for being is its huge deposit of molybdenum ore. The Climax mine was the largest molybdenum mine in the world, and for many years it supplied three-fourths of the world's supply of the metal. Over the years it evolved from "at times the largest underground mine in the world," into a pit mine.

The village of Climax is now considered to be a ghost town. The former Colorado & Southern Railway line from Leadville is now operated as a tourist line by Leadville, Colorado & Southern Railroad. The line stops at an overview of the Climax Molybdenum Mine and Fremont Pass. Climax is also a destination for automobile tourists, bicyclists, and photographers, but lacking commercial enterprise, the location is not well advertised.

Notable people

Erbey Satterfield, Utah state legislator, was born in Climax.
Dave Gorsuch, Olympian, was born in Climax.

Climate

The town has a borderline subalpine climate (Köppen Dfc), closely bordering on an alpine climate (ETH) with short, mild summers and long, snowy winters. Precipitation falls off in June, but the tail end of the monsoon may cause thunderstorm activity in July and August.

The high elevation means that Climax has consistently cold temperatures throughout the year, with frosts possible in any month and 53.5 mornings falling to or below . The average window for zero temperatures is from November 1 to April 10, though temperatures that low have been reported as late as May 11, 1953 and as early as October 10 of 1982. Climax's 99.6 days that do not top freezing is also the most in the contiguous US – the average window for days not topping freezing being from October 11 to May 4, and cases as late as June 25, 1969 and as early as September 3 of 1961 are known. The high altitude, however, limits extreme minima as in the coldest weather Climax may be warmer than lower valleys; the record low being  on January 12, 1963, and December 23, 1990.

Gallery

References

Further reading

 

Former populated places in Lake County, Colorado
Ghost towns in Colorado